The Dicastery for Bishops, formerly named Congregation for Bishops, is the department of the Roman Curia that oversees the selection of most new bishops. Its proposals require papal approval to take effect, but are usually followed. The Dicastery also schedules the visits at five-year intervals ("ad limina") that bishops are required to make to Rome, when they meet with the pope and various departments of the Curia. It also manages the formation of new dioceses. It is one of the more influential Dicasteries, since it strongly influences the human resources policy of the church.

The Dicastery for Bishops does not have jurisdiction over mission territories and areas managed by the Congregation for the Oriental Churches which has responsibility for Eastern Catholics everywhere and also for Latin Catholics in the Middle East and Greece. Where appointment of bishops and changes in diocesan boundaries require consultation with civil governments, the Secretariat of State has primary responsibility, but must consult the Congregation for Bishops.

The Dicastery for Bishops has jurisdiction over the Pontifical Commission for Latin America, and the dicastery's prefect also serves as the commission's president.

History
The Dicastery for Bishops has its origins in the "Congregation for the Erection of Churches and Consistorial Provisions" founded by Pope Sixtus V on 22 January 1588. Before the Second Vatican Council, when the pope announced the names of new cardinals at a Secret Consistory, that is, a consistory that only churchmen attended, the names of new cardinals would be read out, followed by those of archbishops and bishops. The name was changed from the Sacred Consistorial Congregation to the Congregation for Bishops in 1967. 

Since 30 June 2010 its Prefect has been Cardinal Marc Ouellet. Since 12 October 2013 its Secretary has been Archbishop Ilson de Jesus Montanari. Since 25 January 2012 its Undersecretary has been Monsignor Udo Breitbach.

On 13 July 2022, Pope Francis appointed women as members of this Dicastery for the first time, two religious and one laywoman (Raffaella Petrini, Yvonne Reungoat, and Maria Lia Zervino).

Current procedure
The Dicastery's members who live in Rome meet every other Thursday for an entire morning. Appointments for four dioceses are reviewed in a typical session. Before the meeting, dicastery members are sent documentation on the candidates for each diocese. At the meeting, one member takes the role of the presenter (ponente), reviews the information and makes his own recommendation from the list (terna) of three candidates. Each member, in order of seniority, offers his assessment. The Dicastery's recommendations, including any doubts, questions or minority opinions, are sent to the pope. He usually approves the dicastery’s decision, but may choose to send it back for further discussion and evaluation. The prefect then meets with the pope every Saturday and presents the recommendations of the dicastery. A few days later, the pope informs the dicastery of his decision. The dicastery then notifies the nuncio, who in turn contacts the candidate and asks if he will accept the appointment.

Leadership

Secretaries of the Congregation for the Erection of Churches and Consistorial Provisions (1588–1965)

 Domenico Riviera (1710–1730)
 Carlo Gaetano Stampa (1735–1737)
 Niccola Paracciani Clarelli (1860–1872 ?)
 Carmine Gori-Merosi (1882–1886)
 Carlo Nocella (1892–1903)
 Gaetano de Lai (1908–1928)
 Carlo Perosi (1928–1930)
 Raffaele Rossi (1930–1948)
 Adeodato Giovanni Piazza (1948–1957)
 Marcello Mimmi (1957–1961)
 Carlo Confalonieri (1961–1965)

Prefects
In 1965, the head of the congregation took the title prefect, while the prefect's deputy took that of secretary.

 Carlo Confalonieri (1965–1973)
 Sebastiano Baggio (1973–1984)
 Bernardin Gantin (1984–1998)
 Lucas Moreira Neves, OP (1998–2000)
 Giovanni Battista Re (2000–2010)
 Marc Ouellet, PSS (2010–2023)
 Robert Francis Prevost, OSA (2023–present)

Secretaries
The secretary of the Dicastery for Bishops is concurrently the secretary of the College of Cardinals. During a papal election the secretary of the Dicastery acts as the secretary to the conclave.

 Francesco Carpino (1961–1967)
 Ernesto Civardi (1967–1979)
 Lucas Moreira Neves, OP (1979–1987)
 Giovanni Battista Re (1987–1989)
 Justin Francis Rigali (1989–1994)
 Jorge María Mejía (1994–1998)
 Francesco Monterisi (1998–2009)
 Manuel Monteiro de Castro (2009–2012)
 Lorenzo Baldisseri (2012–2013)
 Ilson de Jesus Montanari (2013–present)

See also
Appointment of Catholic bishops

References

 
1588 establishments in the Papal States
Religious organizations established in the 1580s
Catholic organizations established in the 16th century